Bert Evans (10 August 1922 – 8 May 2008) was a Welsh-American football player who earned one cap with the U.S. national team in an 8–1 loss to England on 28 May 1959.

Evans signed professional forms with Swansea Town on his 17th birthday in August 1939. Just three weeks later, however, war broke out and the Football League suspended operations. Evans would never get the chance to shine for his hometown team.  He joined the Royal Air Force and played for their representative XI when stationed in Egypt. After the hostilities, Evans rebuilt his football career, signing for Lovell's Athletic. After winning the Welsh Football League, the club graduated to the Southern League in 1947.  In April 1951, Hubert Evans signed for Newport County, at long last making his debut in the Football League at 28 years of age.  After 14 appearances (1 goal), Evans returned to the Southern League with another Welsh club, Llanelli.  In 1957, Evans moved to the United States and settled in California.  When he arrived he joined the semi-professional San Pedro McIlvaine Canvasbacks, playing as a central defender and team captain when they won the 1959 National Challenge Cup.  In 1961, he moved to the San Pedro Toros.

References

1922 births
American soccer players
Llanelli Town A.F.C. players
Lovell's Athletic F.C. players
Newport County A.F.C. players
Swansea City A.F.C. players
Welsh footballers
United States men's international soccer players
2008 deaths
Association football midfielders
Royal Air Force personnel of World War II